Ice Arena Tomaszów Mazowiecki is Poland's first year-round ice skating rink that serves for speed skating, figure skating, ice hockey, short track and roller skating. It is located near Pilica River in Tomaszów Mazowiecki, 10 kilometers away from the Olympic Sports Centre in Spała, Poland. It was built between 2016 and 2017.

Construction 

The investment was initiated by Mayor of Tomaszów Mazowiecki Marcin Witko, and Polish Sport and Tourism Minister Witold Bańka. Rosa-Bud company from Radom, Poland was the main builder of the arena. The project was included in a Strategic Investments Program of Sport and Tourism Ministry of the Republic of Poland. Funding from the ministry was 19 million PLN, while other financial means came from local government. The process of construction lasted only fourteen months – it began in August 2016, and main works ended in September 2017. The official opening of the arena took place on December 14, 2017. President of Poland, Andrzej Duda, took part in an official ceremony, which was also celebrated by a concert by Ray Wilson.

Characteristics 
Ice Arena in Tomaszów Mazowiecki is the first and only year-round indoor arena designated for winter sports in Poland. The facility is accommodated to organizing events of different ranges. The arena meets the strict requirements of International Skating Union, which makes it capable of organizing international events.

A full-sized  speed skating track, ice hockey, figure skating and short track rinks are located in this space. It also contains four ice freezing zones and modern sound and lighting systems that meet with HD broadcasting standards.

Arena in numbers 
 2000 lx – illuminance, only in LED technology
 1.5 seconds – sound movement between extreme points of the building. Thanks to the sound support system, all participants of the events can hear sound in real time, with no echo.
  is the building's area.
  is the allotment that Arena Lodowa is located on.
 850 tons is the roof's steel construction.
 4 Olympic disciplines are practised in the arena.

The arena also offers fully equipped conference rooms. Beyond practice hours and sport events, the facility serves as a place for recreation for the citizens of Tomaszów Mazowiecki, and surrounding areas. During the course of the first summer holidays after the opening of the arena, the Town Hall organized sports school for children who stay in the city during summer. Concerts and cultural mass events are also organized in the facility.

Athletes and trainers related to the Arena 

 Karolina Bosiek, the youngest Polish Olympian (2018, Pjongczang)
 Karolina Gąsecka
 Aleksandra Kapruziak
 Natalia Czerwonka
 Jaromir Radke
 Paweł Abratkiewicz
 Zbigniew Bródka
Wiesław Kmiecik
Jolanta Gołębiewska-Kmiecik

Notable events 
 Polish Championships in speed skating and all-round event – December 16–17, 2017
 Polish Championships in speed skating on distances – October 26–28, 2017
 Polish Championships in Short Track – January 19–21; 2018
 2018 World Junior Short Track Speed Skating Championships - March 2–4, 2018
 2018–19 ISU Speed Skating World Cup -  December 7-8, 2018
 Polish Seniors Championships in Short Track – March 15–17, 2018
 Concert celebrating 40th anniversary of Bajm – April 13, 2018
 Nationwide challenge: Little Heroes – June 21, 2018
 Be Active Tour with Ewa Chodakowska – July 1, 2018
Juniors World Cup in speed skating – November 24–25, 2018
 2018–19 ISU Speed Skating World Cup
Czech Speed Skating Championships 2019 
 2019–20 ISU Speed Skating World Cup
 2022–23 ISU Speed Skating World Cup

See also 
 Official website of Ice Arena Tomaszów Mazowiecki

References

Indoor speed skating venues
Speed skating venues
Indoor ice hockey venues in Poland
Sport in Tomaszów Mazowiecki
Speed skating in Poland